Local elections took place in many parts of England on 2 May 2002. All London borough council seats were elected as well a third of the seats on each of the Metropolitan Boroughs. Many unitary Authorities and District councils also had elections. There were no local elections in Scotland, Wales or Northern Ireland.

Summary of results
Simon Parker of The Guardian described the elections as "a round of embarrassing [sic] defeats for Labour in a set of council elections that also saw opposition parties making minor inroads into the party's dominant position in local government. [...] But the night really belonged to independents and the smaller parties, who made some high-profile gains as the voters expressed their dissatisfaction with mainstream politics."

England

London boroughs
In all 32 London boroughs, the whole council was up for election.

‡ New ward boundaries

Metropolitan boroughs
All 36 English Metropolitan borough councils had one third of their seats up for election.

Unitary authorities

Whole council
In six English Unitary authorities, the whole council was up for election.

‡ New ward boundaries

Third of council
In 12 English Unitary authorities, one third of the council was up for election.

District councils

Whole council
In 46 English district authorities, the whole council was up for election.

‡ New ward boundaries

Third of council
In 42 English district authorities, one third of the council was up for election.

Mayoral elections
There were seven elections for directly elected mayors.

Notes

References

Vote 2002 BBC News
Local elections in England: 2 May 2002. House of Commons Library Research Paper 02/33.
Full 2002 ward results
The Guardian local election coverage

 
2002
Local elections